Abu Faris Abdallah, known as al-Wathiq Billah (1564 – 1608) was a Saadi dynasty ruler of some areas of Morocco. He was one of the sons of Ahmad al-Mansur and one of his harem slave concubines named Elkheizourân (some cite her name as Eldjauher).  He ruled in the south of the country as well as Marrakesh and Fez between 1603 and 1608. He had numerous fights with his half-brother Zidan Abu Maali (r. 1603–1627).

References

1564 births
1608 deaths
Saadi dynasty
Sultans of Morocco
16th-century Moroccan people
17th-century Moroccan people
17th-century monarchs in Africa
16th-century Arabs